The Republic of Prekmurje (Prekmurje Slovene: Reszpublika Szlovenszka okroglina, Mörszka Reszpublika) was an unrecognized state in Prekmurje, an area traditionally known in Hungarian as Vendvidék  ("Wendic March"). On June 6, 1919, Prekmurje was incorporated into the newly established Kingdom of Serbs, Croats and Slovenes (renamed "Yugoslavia" in 1929).

The state bordered with Austria to the north, Hungary to the east, and the Kingdom of Serbs, Croats and Slovenes to the west and south.

Origins 
Slovenian ethnic territory was once more extensive than today, extending from Friuli in northeast Italy to Lake Balaton in Hungary. The Magyars settled the eastern part of this area in the early 10th century, and Prekmurje (along with Croatia and Slovakia) eventually became part of the Kingdom of Hungary. Thus Slovenes living east of the Mura River developed a separate identity from those west of the river under Austrian control as Prekmurje Slovenians. The Prekmurje Slovene language became distinctive. In the 16th and 18th centuries, numerous Slovene families from the Mura and Raba valleys settled in Somogy County.

History 
During World War I, the leaders of the Slovene minority in Prekmurje were mostly Catholic priests and Lutheran ministers. After the collapse of Austria-Hungary, together with secular leaders (but with diverging political views), the Catholic Prekmurje clerics sided with the Kingdom of Serbs, Croats and Slovenes. However, the Lutheran Slovenes still supported Hungarian rule. The Catholic party wished to proclaim an independent state, whereas the Lutheran Slovenes and Hungarians of Prekmurje supported remaining under Hungarian authority.

The (mutinous) Croatian Army annexed Prekmurje in 1918, but the 83rd Hungarian Infantry Regiment recaptured it. Soon, the Truce of Belgrade in 1918 gave Mura and Raba Country to Hungary, but the Serbs had second thoughts and sought to extend their area of control northwards to create a Yugoslav-Czechoslovak border.

On March 21, 1919, the Hungarian communists and Social Democrats created the Hungarian Soviet Republic, which was anti-religious, internationalist, and pro-Soviet. The communists wanted to expropriate the ecclesiastical assets, starting with all the lordships. The Lutherans and the Catholics resisted this. In order to be rid of the communists, the Catholic Party decided to create an autonomous republic. The Hungarian and Slovenian socialists wanted to establish a Soviet system in Prekmurje, but there was little support and few people gave aid to the Soviet Republic.  In Međimurje the Serbian and Croatian military aligned themselves against Prekmurje.

In Lendava, the anti-communist military campaign started off well but soon fell apart. In Murska Sobota the socialist Vilmos Tkálecz, a former schoolmaster and soldier in the first World War, was involved in illegal trade, which the communist statutes forbade. Tkálecz was not a leftist, Yugoslav, or pro-Hungarian. On May 29, Tkálecz and some followers declared independence from Hungary. Tkálecz invoked the Fourteen Points of Woodrow Wilson, which granted autonomy rights for national minorities. The new state recognized Austria in order to receive some weapons, together with those from Hungarian military units. However, Tkálecz frustrated the Catholics; the people of Prekmurje did not support the republic.

The Prekmurje Republic sought to expand its boundaries and received minute pieces of land: In Murska Sobota, the Republic received the territory of the districts of Murska Sobota, Lendava, Szentgotthárd, and some villages in the Őrség area, and already possessed the northern, central, and southwestern Mura march districts. The principal settlements of the republic were Murska Sobota, Szentgotthárd, Lendava, Beltinci, and Dobrovnik.

Aftermath 
On June 6, 1919, the Hungarian Red Army marched into Prekmurje and overthrew the republic. Tkálecz fled to Austria. A communist militia spread over the land and murdered all their opponents. In addition, a five million crown indemnity was laid upon the people and a harsh Red Terror was continued by the occupying militia.

On August 1, 1919, the Hungarian Soviet Republic was overthrown by Romanian forces, and soon the Serbian Army marched into Prekmurje, ending communist rule there.

In 1920, Tkálecz was living in Hungary in the village of Nagykarácsony in (Fejér County) as a schoolmaster. The 1920 Treaty of Trianon established the present Hungarian borders.

Population 
The population of the Prekmurje Republic was approximately 100,000, of which 20,000 to 22,000 were Hungarians; other large minorities included a German minority of 8,000 (especially in the villages of Alsószölnök, Fikšinci, Kramarovci and Ocinje) and a Croat minority of 3,000. Other ethnic groups included Jews and Roma. The religious composition was one third Lutheran, over half Catholic, and some Calvinist and Jewish minorities. In a few villages, Roma speak Prekmurje Slovenian or Hungarian as their native languages.

See also 
Banat Republic
Former countries in Europe after 1815
Hungarian Slovenes
List of historical unrecognized countries
Pro-independence movements in the Russian Civil War
Serbian-Hungarian Baranya-Baja Republic
Slovene March (Kingdom of Hungary)

External links 
 

Republic
Aftermath of World War I in Hungary
Former states and territories in Slovenia
Former countries in the Balkans
Former unrecognized countries
States and territories established in 1919
States and territories disestablished in 1919
1919 in Hungary
1919 establishments in Yugoslavia
1919 disestablishments in Yugoslavia
Dissolution of Austria-Hungary
History of the Slovenes
Former republics